2008 World Junior Championships may refer to:

 Athletics: 2008 World Junior Championships in Athletics
 Figure skating: 2008 World Junior Figure Skating Championships
 Ice hockey: 2008 World Junior Ice Hockey Championships
 Motorcycle speedway:
 2008 Individual Speedway Junior World Championship
 2008 Team Speedway Junior World Championship

See also
 2008 World Cup (disambiguation)
 2008 Continental Championships (disambiguation)
 2008 World Championships (disambiguation)